Shatagram Union is a union parishad of Birgonj Upazila, in Dinajpur District, Rangpur Division, Bangladesh. There are 18 villages and 18 mouzas in the union.

References

External links 
 

Unions of Rangpur Division
Unions of Dinajpur District, Bangladesh